The Ren & Stimpy Show: Time Warp is a video game developed by Sculptured Software and published by THQ for the Super Nintendo Entertainment System. The game was released in November 1994.

Gameplay
The Ren & Stimpy Show: Time Warp features 10 stages. The game is a beat 'em up, consisting of basic attacks, like Ren's slap, and Stimpy's hairball attack. The game features some references to the show, such as the "Happy Happy Joy Joy song"

Reception
The reviewers of Electronic Gaming Monthly praised the game's animations and various attacks, but stated that the controls "could be tweaked up a little more".

Next Generation reviewed the game, rating it one star out of five, and stated that "When Nickelodeon fired creator John Kricfalusi, the heart and soul were sucked out of the pair. This game puts the final nail in the coffin."

Reviews
GamePro (Dec, 1994)
Video Games & Computer Entertainment - Dec, 1994

References

1994 video games
Multiplayer and single-player video games
Platform games
Super Nintendo Entertainment System games
Super Nintendo Entertainment System-only games
The Ren & Stimpy Show video games
THQ games
Video games about time travel
Video games developed in the United States